The Wyperfeld National Park is the third largest national park in Victoria, Australia, located in the Mallee district, approximately  northwest of Melbourne, The national park was declared in 1921 and expanded significantly to protect  of mallee, woodland, and heathland. For management purposes, the Wyperfeld National Park is managed with the Hattah-Kulkyne National Park, Murray-Sunset National Park, Lake Albacutya Park and Murray-Kulkyne Park as part of the Victorian Mallee Parks.

History
Like most of north-western Victoria, Wyperfeld was a shallow sea from about 25 million years ago until fairly recent times. The current landforms took shape as the sea gradually retreated, leaving a vast expanse of sandy sediment which, as it dried, was formed into sand dunes during the period 40,000 to 15,000 years ago.

Before European settlement, the network of ephemeral lakes filled and emptied, on average, about every 20 years, typically remaining dry for about half that period at a time. More recently, agricultural irrigation and drainage projects in the surrounding areas have cut off a significant part of Wyperfeld's water supply, and the lakes have not been completely filled since 1975, and had drained again just two years later.

Environment
In good years, the Wimmera River fills Lake Hindmarsh to the south of the park, which overflows along Outlet Creek, which then fills Lake Albacutya to the immediate south of the park, and (given sufficient rain) flows further north into Wyperfeld itself, forming a series of smaller lakes which support rich floral and faunal communities based around black box and river red gum. The park has seen no inflow of water for many years, despite downstream flooding in 2011. The reserve is part of the Wyperfeld, Big Desert and Ngarkat Important Bird Area, identified as such by BirdLife International because of its importance for the conservation of malleefowl and other species of mallee birds.

See also 

 Protected areas of Victoria (Australia)

References

External links

National parks of Victoria (Australia)
Protected areas established in 1921
1921 establishments in Australia
Mallee (Victoria)